Noorpur may refer to one of the following places in Punjab, Pakistan:

 Noorpur Thal, a city in Khushab District of Punjab 
 Noorpur Thal Tehsil, a tehsil in Khushab District of Punjab 
 Jamali Noorpur, a union council of Khushab District
 Noorpur railway station in Toba Tek Singh District of Punjab
 Noor Pur 122 JB, a town in Faisalabad District of Punjab 
 Noorpur, Chakwal, a town in Chakwal District of Punjab